Andrew Murray (born November 6, 1981) is a Canadian-Croatian former professional ice hockey player who played in the National Hockey League (NHL). He ended his professional career playing two seasons for KHL Medveščak Zagreb of the Kontinental Hockey League (KHL).

Playing career
Murray played college hockey for Bemidji State University for four seasons under head coach Tom Serratore where he was a three time captain and a 2005 graduate.  Andrew left the program as its Division I-era scoring leader with 46-69—115 points in 128 contests ranking him seventh on the College Hockey America (CHA) career list and 30th on BSU's all-time scoring chart. His 46 goals seat him in fourth among BSU's D-I goal-scoring leaders while his 69 assists is tied for BSU Division I-era best.

He was recalled by the Columbus Blue Jackets on December 27, 2007, to play his first NHL game. He scored his first NHL goal on January 2, 2008, against Jean-Sébastien Giguère of the Anaheim Ducks.  The Columbus Blue Jackets re-signed Murray to a three-year, one-way contract on March 7, 2008.  The deal ran through the 2010–11 season.

On July 13, 2011, Murray was signed to a one-year, two-way contract by the San Jose Sharks.

On February 6, 2012, the San Jose Sharks placed Murray on waivers, and he was sent down to the Worcester Sharks after he cleared waivers on February 7, 2012.

On June 10, 2012, Murray's negotiation rights were traded to the Detroit Red Wings with a conditional draft pick for 2014 as part of a trade deal for Brad Stuart. News reports from Detroit suggest the Wings have no interest in keeping Murray.

On July 6, 2012, it was announced that Murray had been signed to a one-year, two-way deal with the St. Louis Blues. With the NHL lock-out coming to affect, Murray was assigned directly by the Blues to AHL affiliate, the Peoria Rivermen. During the duration of the 2012–13 season, Murray scored 14 goals and 31 points in 51 games. He was recalled by St. Louis and played a solitary game in a 3–0 defeat to the Chicago Blackhawks on February 28, 2013.

On July 29, 2013, Murray signed his first contract abroad with a one-year contract with KHL Medveščak Zagreb from Croatia, the newest member of  Kontinental Hockey League.

Career statistics

Regular season and playoffs

International

Awards and honours

References

External links

1981 births
Bemidji State Beavers men's ice hockey players
Canadian expatriate ice hockey players in Croatia
Canadian ice hockey centres
Columbus Blue Jackets draft picks
Columbus Blue Jackets players
Croatian ice hockey centres
Croatian people of Canadian descent
Ice hockey people from Manitoba
KHL Medveščak Zagreb players
Living people
Peoria Rivermen (AHL) players
San Jose Sharks players
Selkirk Steelers players
Sportspeople from Selkirk, Manitoba
St. Louis Blues players
Syracuse Crunch players
Worcester Sharks players